Samuel Brenton Whitney (June 4, 1842 – August 3, 1914) was a United States organist, conductor and composer.  His compositions were primarily church music and chamber works.

Biography
Samuel Brenton Whitney was born in Woodstock, Vermont on June 4, 1842. He was a pupil of Charles Wels of New York City and then John Knowles Paine of Cambridge, Massachusetts. He secured his first organ appointment in Cambridge. He came to be regarded as the greatest interpreter of Johann Sebastian Bach in the United States, and was appointed professor of organ playing and lecturer in music at the Boston University and the New England Conservatory. In 1871 he was appointed organist and choir director of the Church of the Advent, Boston. His compositions included many anthems and other church pieces, songs, pianoforte music, sonatas, transcriptions, and arrangements for the organ.

He died at his sister's home in Woodstock on August 3, 1914.

Notes

References

External links
 

1842 births
1914 deaths
American male composers
American composers
American organists
American male organists
Boston University faculty
New England Conservatory faculty